Tolo (died 1506) was an ancestor to the Qing dynasty. He was the eldest son of Cungšan, Nurhaci's grand uncle. His family name is Aisin Gioro (愛新覺羅); his name was translated as Tole (脫羅) and Tolv (土老).

Life 
In the years of Chenghua (成化) after Cungšan died and a siege with the Three Guards of Jianzhou (建州) and Ming army, the Ming economy collapsed. In the Ming dynasty, Tolo commanded the Left Guard of Jianzhou. Tolo helped recover the economy, expanding trade with the Nüzhen (女真) at the borders, and further developing agricultural production. For his contributions, the Ming dynasty promoted him to Dudu Jianzhou Left Guard.

Tolo died in 1506. His son Toyuebeo succeeded his father.

See also
Cuyan

References

Jurchens in Ming dynasty
15th-century births
1506 deaths
Year of birth unknown